Alexander Clark Mitchell (October 11, 1860 – July 7, 1911) was a U.S. Representative from Kansas.

Born in Cincinnati, Ohio, Mitchell moved to Kansas in 1867 with his parents, who settled in Douglas County, near Lawrence, Kansas. He attended the public schools, and was graduated from the law department of the University of Kansas at Lawrence in 1889. He was admitted to the bar the same year and commenced practice in Lawrence.

Mitchell served as prosecuting attorney of Douglas County 1894–1898, and as a member of the University of Kansas board of regents 1904-10. He served as a member of the State board of law examiners 1907-10, and was a member of the Kansas House of Representatives 1907-11. He was elected as a Republican to the Sixty-second Congress and served from March 4, 1911, until his death in Lawrence, Kansas, July 7, 1911, and was interred in Oak Hill Cemetery.

See also
List of United States Congress members who died in office (1900–49)

References

 Alexander C. Mitchell, late a representative from Kansas, Memorial addresses delivered in the House of Representatives and Senate frontispiece 1913

External links
 

1860 births
1911 deaths
Politicians from Cincinnati
Politicians from Lawrence, Kansas
Kansas lawyers
American prosecutors
Republican Party members of the Kansas House of Representatives
University of Kansas alumni
Republican Party members of the United States House of Representatives from Kansas
19th-century American politicians
19th-century American lawyers